Kaique Vergilio da Silva (born 19 abril 1999), known as Gracha or simply Kaique, is a Brazilian professional footballer who plays as a forward for Campeonato Gaúcho Série A2 club Avenida.

Club career
Kaique was born in São Paulo, and joined Corinthians' youth setup at the age of eight. After progressing through the youth setup, he was loaned to J2 League side Thespakusatsu Gunma on 13 August 2014.

Kaique made his senior debut on 31 August 2014, coming on as a late substitute for Yohei Sakai in a 3–1 away loss against Matsumoto Yamaga FC. After appearing rarely, he remained at the club for a further year, and started to feature more regularly.

On 18 May 2016, Kaique signed for Santos on loan until the end of the year, being initially assigned to the B-team. The following 6 January, he extended his contract for one further year.

In January 2018, Kaique went on trial with Azerbaijan Premier League club Gabala FK.

Career statistics

References

External links

1996 births
Living people
Footballers from São Paulo
Brazilian footballers
Association football forwards
Campeonato Brasileiro Série D players
Sport Club Corinthians Paulista players
Santos FC players
Atlético Clube Paranavaí players
Associação Desportiva São Caetano players
Esporte Clube Água Santa players
Clube Atlético Votuporanguense players
J2 League players
Thespakusatsu Gunma players
Uruguayan Primera División players
Centro Atlético Fénix players
Brazilian expatriate footballers
Brazilian expatriate sportspeople in Japan
Brazilian expatriate sportspeople in Uruguay
Expatriate footballers in Japan
Expatriate footballers in Uruguay